Marvel Nemesis: Rise of the Imperfects is a fighting game for the PlayStation 2, Xbox, GameCube, Nintendo DS, and PSP, which ties into the "Marvel Nemesis" comic book series. It was released on September 20, 2005 in North America and October 14 in Europe. The game focuses on Marvel Comics characters facing a new team of super villains known as The Imperfects. Upon release, the game was not received very well by critics.

Gameplay
The game pitches a series of Marvel heroes and villains, including Venom, Wolverine, Iron Man, and Spider-Man against a series of original EA-created/owned characters. Combat is simplified in favor of allowing the player greater movement, and the game initially drew comparisons to Power Stone, Super Smash Bros. and Ehrgeiz as a result. The game featured Fatality-like finishing moves that could be triggered as soon as an opponent's health falls to 25% or lower.

Plot summary
As heroes battle invading aliens, a Daredevil in distress calls Elektra for help. She finds him on the Daily Bugle building, where he fights her. She defeats him and removes an alien device from the back of his neck. This releases him from the control of one Niles Van Roekel, who lets his Imperfects into the city to fight heroes. The heroes also find more alien devices and fight any "infected" to remove those devices.

Meanwhile, a girl named Maya trains to fulfill Roekel's goal to create the best and most deadly warrior. She begins by destroying different alien devices. As training continues, she takes on the name Paragon, fighting the same aliens the heroes are.

She fights her way out of the secret headquarters of the Imperfects and into the city, where Magneto finds her. So that Paragon will serve as his minion, he uses an alien device to control her. Paragon eventually breaks free of the device's control and defeats Magneto. She realizes that she is not evil and plans to stop Roekel. Roekel reveals that he is an alien, is responsible for and will spread the invasion. Maya attacks Roekel and kills him by taking away his life force. She stops the invasion, and she and the other Imperfects join together to share the Earth with the heroes.

Characters

Marvel

 Captain America
 Daredevil
 Doctor Doom
 Elektra
 Human Torch
 Iron Man
 Magneto
 Spider-Man
 Storm
 Thing
 Venom
 Wolverine

Imperfects

 Brigade
 Fault Zone
 Hazmat
 Johnny Ohm
 Niles Van Roekel
 Paragon
 Solara
 Wink

Non-playable

Hulk
Punisher

Development
Rise of the Imperfects was the first game from a Marvel-Electronic Arts partnership from 2004 to 2006. From July 2005 to December 2006, Marvel Comics published a six-issue comic book limited series. Written by Greg Pak and drawn by Renato Arlem, it was a tie-in and prequel to the game.

Points in the video game story and the comic books directly contradict each other. The two still share the same characters and introduce the EA characters with, minor details aside, the same background stories and powers. Though the story implies the EA characters are part of the regular Marvel continuity, they have yet to appear elsewhere in the Marvel Multiverse due to the game's poor reception and EA's ownership of the characters.

Reception

The consoles and PSP versions received "mixed or average" reviews according to the review aggregation website Metacritic, while the Nintendo DS version received "generally unfavorable reviews".

The game was criticized for its poor story mode and limited multiplayer. Many complaints about the game revolved around the fact that AI opponents would chain-abuse projectile special moves, dealing significant damage to a player character, with the AI character immediately triggering the fatality upon dropping the player to low health. 

 GT Video Review
 Team Xbox Review
 The Daily Raider Review

References

External links
 Marvel video games on Marvel.com

2005 video games
Electronic Arts games
Windows games
GameCube games
Multiplayer and single-player video games
Nintendo DS games
PlayStation 2 games
PlayStation Portable games
Superhero video games
Fighting games
Video games based on Marvel Comics
Video games developed in Canada
Video games set in New York City
Xbox games
Video games using Havok
Video games developed in the United States